Beach wrestling competition at the 2014 Asian Beach Games was held in Phuket, Thailand from 15 to 17 November 2014 at Patong Beach.

Medalists

Men

Women

Medal table

Results

Men

70 kg
15 November

Pools

Knockout round

80 kg
16 November

Pools

Knockout round

+80 kg
17 November

Pools

Knockout round

Women

50 kg
15 November

60 kg
16 November

Pools

Final round

+60 kg
17 November

References

External links 
 Official website

2014 Asian Beach Games events
Asian Beach Games
2014
International wrestling competitions hosted by Thailand